Australian Gangster is an Australian television miniseries, produced by the Seven Network, which premiered on 13 September 2021. The miniseries is directed by Gregor Jordan and Fadia Abboud and produced by Dan Edwards, John Edwards and Gregor Jordan for Roadshow Rough Diamond.

Production

The series was announced by Seven at their annual upfronts in October 2017 and was originally meant to air sometime in 2018, however due to pending legal cases of some of the characters being depicted, the series was delayed until the cases had closed. After two years without any information regarding the series, on 21 October 2020, Seven announced at their annual upfronts that the series will finally air sometime in 2021.

Synopsis 
Drug dealer, gangster, gym-junky, Lamborghini driver, husband, father, . Australian Gangster is a four hour TV series about the life and death of a new breed of Sydney criminal. The kind that doesn't care about playing it safe or keeping a low profile or even getting caught. Our main character is emblematic of the type of modern gangster that only really cares about looking good on Instagram, making a name for himself in a new, wannabe glamorous crime scene, while at the same time trying to manage the pressures of family life.

Cast 
 Alexander Bertrand as Pasquale Barbaro
 Peter Gonis
 Louisa Mignone as Melinda, Barbaro's wife
 Michael Vice
 Rahel Romahn as Mohammed "Little Crazy" Hamzy, Brothers for Life member
 Zachary Garred 
 Karla Tonkich 
 Ishak Issa
 Steve Bastoni
 Simon Palomares
 Joseph Fala
 Federico Gazzilli
 Marie Shanahan
 Moodi Dennaoui
David Paulsen

Reception

Viewership

The first part had an average rating of 359,000 viewers, and the second part has an average rating of 340,000.

References

2020s Australian drama television series
2020s Australian crime television series
Seven Network original programming
Television shows set in Sydney
Films about organised crime in Australia